Na Hyeon-hui (born September 20, 1970) is a South Korean actress and singer.

Filmography

Television series

Film

Variety show

Theater

Broadcasting

Album

Official

OST

Awards and nominations

References

External links

Na Hyun-hee at Daum 
Na Hyun-hee at Naver Movies 

South Korean film actresses
South Korean television actresses
South Korean television personalities
Living people
1970 births
People from Busan
University of Suwon alumni
20th-century South Korean actresses
21st-century South Korean actresses
20th-century South Korean women singers
21st-century South Korean women singers